Soma Mondal is the current Chairperson of Steel Authority of India (w.e.f. 1 January 2021). Smt. Soma Mondal has the distinction of not only being the first woman Functional Director of SAIL, but she is also the first woman Chairman of the company. As a chairperson she is also currently the chief executive of the corporation.

Early life 

Soma Mondal was born and grew up in an Odia middle-class family in Bhubaneswar. Her father was an agricultural economist. She majored in Electrical Engineering from National Institute of Technology, Rourkela in 1984.

Career
Mondal has over 35 years of experience in the metal industry. She commenced her career as a Graduate Engineer Trainee at NALCO and rose through the ranks to take over the  mantle of Director (Commercial) at NALCO in the year 2014.

Mondal joined SAIL in March, 2017 as Director (Commercial). ​She took over as chairperson of the Maharatna PSU from Anil Kumar Chaudhary, who retired in December, 2020. She is well known in the Aluminium Industry for her contribution in various Industry forums. In March, 2021 she was elected as the chairperson of Standing Conference of Public Enterprises (SCOPE), the organization representing the Central Government Public Enterprises.

References

Living people
21st-century Indian businesswomen
21st-century Indian businesspeople
Year of birth missing (living people)
People from Bhubaneswar